The Granite Canal Hydroelectric Generating Station is a component of the Newfoundland and Labrador Hydro Corporation's Bay d’Espoir Hydro Electric Development system. The generating station has a rated capacity of 40 MW with an annual average energy production of 224 gigawatt hours (GWh). The generating unit at Granite Canal utilizes approximately 37 metres of head with a rated plant flow of 122.4 cubic metres per second. The unit is equipped with a Kaplan turbine and was first synchronized on May 26, 2003.

A fish habitat compensation system was included in this development to ensure any aquatic habitat loss was avoided, reduced or replaced. A Fish Habitat Compensation Agreement was signed with Fisheries and Oceans Canada to ensure proper construction, utilization and long term viability of the facility.

Hydroelectric power stations in Newfoundland and Labrador
Newfoundland and Labrador Hydro